Vatne is a former municipality in Møre og Romsdal county, Norway. The municipality existed from 1902 until its dissolution in 1965. The  municipality included land and islands surrounding the Midfjorden and Vatnefjorden in what is now part of Ålesund Municipality and Molde Municipality. The administrative centre was the village of Vatne where Vatne Church is located.

History
On 1 January 1902, the northern part of Skodje Municipality was split off to form the new Vatne Municipality. Vatne had an initial population of 1,547. During the 1960s, there were many municipal mergers across Norway due to the work of the Schei Committee. On 1 January 1965, Vatne Municipality was dissolved.  The island of Dryna and the western part of the island of Midøya (population: 334) were merged with Sør-Aukra Municipality to create the new Midsund Municipality. The remainder of Vatne (population: 2,260) was incorporated into Haram Municipality. Since 2020, the area is part of Ålesund and Molde municipalities.

Government
All municipalities in Norway, including Vatne, are responsible for primary education (through 10th grade), outpatient health services, senior citizen services, unemployment and other social services, zoning, economic development, and municipal roads.  The municipality is governed by a municipal council of elected representatives, which in turn elects a mayor.

Municipal council
The municipal council  of Vatne was made up of 17 representatives that were elected to four year terms.  The party breakdown of the final municipal council was as follows:

See also
List of former municipalities of Norway

References

Molde
Ålesund
Former municipalities of Norway
1902 establishments in Norway
1965 disestablishments in Norway